The women's welterweight 69 kg boxing event at the 2019 European Games in Minsk was held from 24 to 29 June at the Uruchie Sports Palace.

Results

References

External links
Draw Sheet

Women 69
2019 in women's boxing